Zinc bromide (ZnBr2) is an inorganic compound with the chemical formula ZnBr2.  It is a colourless salt that shares many properties with zinc chloride (ZnCl2), namely a high solubility in water forming acidic solutions, and good solubility in organic solvents. It is hygroscopic and forms a dihydrate ZnBr2·2H2O.

Production
ZnBr2 · 2H2O is prepared by treating zinc oxide or zinc metal with hydrobromic acid.   
 ZnO + 2HBr  +  H2O  →   ZnBr2·2H2O
 Zn + 2HBr  →   ZnBr2 +  H2

The anhydrous material can be produced by dehydration of the dihydrate with hot CO2 or by reaction of zinc metal and bromine. Sublimation in a stream of hydrogen bromide also gives the anhydrous derivative.

Structure
ZnBr2 crystallizes in the same structure as ZnI2: four tetrahedral Zn centers share three vertices to form “super-tetrahedra” of nominal composition {Zn4Br10}2−, which are linked by their vertices to form a three-dimensional structure. The dihydrate ZnBr2 · 2H2O can be described as ([Zn(H2O)6]2+)2([Zn2Br6]2-).

Gaseous ZnBr2 is linear in accordance with VSEPR theory with a Zn-Br bond length of 221 pm.

Uses
Zinc bromide is used in the following applications:

 In organic chemistry as a Lewis acid.
 It is the electrolyte in the zinc bromide battery.
 In oil and natural gas wells, solutions containing zinc bromide are used to displace drilling mud when transitioning from the drilling phase to the completion phase or in well workover operations.  The extremely dense brine solution gives the fluid its weight of 20 pounds/gallon, which makes it especially useful in holding back flammable oil and gas particles in high pressure wells.  However, the high acidity and osmolarity cause corrosion and handling problems.  Crews must be issued slicker suits and rubber boots because the fluid is so dehydrating.
 Zinc bromide solutions can be used as a transparent shield against radiation. The space between two glass panes is filled with a strong aqueous solution of zinc bromide with a very high density, to be used as a window on a hot cell. This type of window has the advantage over lead glass in that it will not darken as a result of exposure to radiation. All glass will darken slowly over time due to radiation, however this is especially true in a hot cell, where exceptional levels of radiation are present. The advantage of an aqueous salt solution is that any radiation damage will last less than a millisecond, so the shield will undergo self-repair.

Safety
Safety considerations are similar to those for zinc chloride, for which the toxic dose for humans is 3–5 g.

See also
Zinc chloride
Zinc fluoride
Zinc iodide
Cadmium bromide

References

zinc
Metal halides
bromide